The War Measures Act (5 George V, Chap. 2) was a statute of the Parliament of Canada that provided for the declaration of war, invasion, or insurrection, and the types of emergency measures that could thereby be taken. The Act was brought into force three times in Canadian history: during the First World War, Second World War, and the 1970 October Crisis.

The Act was questioned for its suspension of civil liberties and personal freedoms, including only for Ukrainians and other Europeans during Canada's first national internment operations of 19141920, the Second World War's Japanese Canadian internment, and in the October Crisis. In 1988, it was repealed and replaced by the Emergencies Act.

First World War

In the First World War, a state of war with Germany was declared by the United Kingdom on behalf of the entire British Empire. Canada was notified by telegraphic despatch accordingly, effective 4 August 1914,  and that status remained in effect until 10 January 1920.

The War Measures Act, 1914, was subsequently adopted on 22 August 1914 to ratify all steps taken by Canada from the declaration of war, to continue until the war was over. Sections 2 to 6 of the original Act in particular provided for the following:

Extent of authority under the Act
The Act conferred broad authority, and was even held by the Supreme Court of Canada in In re Gray to include the power to amend other Acts by way of regulation. Noting that the British House of Lords, in R v Halliday, had held in 1917 that the Defence of the Realm Act 1914 possessed similar wide powers with respect to the United Kingdom, Chief Justice of Canada Sir Charles Fitzpatrick declared:

Internment during First World War and afterwards

Canada's first national internment operations of 1914–1920 involved the internment of both genuine POWs and thousands of civilians, most of them Ukrainians who had come from western Ukrainian lands (Galicia and Northern Bukovina) then held by the Austro-Hungarian Empire. Branded as "enemy aliens", they were stripped of what little wealth they had, forced to work for the profit of their jailers and subjected to other state-sanctioned censures, including disenfranchisement under the Wartime Elections Act. A campaign begun by the Ukrainian Canadian Civil Liberties Association in 1985 aimed at securing official acknowledgement and symbolic restitution for what happened succeeded in 2005, following passage of the Internment of Persons of Ukrainian Origin Recognition Act, which resulted in the establishment of the Canadian First World War Internment Recognition Fund.

With the advent of the Russian Revolution in 1917, additional regulations and orders were added to make the membership in a number of organizations, including socialist and communist organizations, forbidden. Immigration from nations that were connected directly or indirectly with the Austro-Hungarian Empire and Germany was stopped and natives of these countries (Austria, Hungary, Germany and Ukraine) were classed as enemy aliens under the Act. These enemy aliens were required to carry identification with them at all times and forbidden from possessing firearms, leaving the country without permission, or publishing or reading anything in a language other than English or French. Thousands of these enemy aliens were also interned in camps or deported from Canada. It was not until the labour shortage in Canada became dire that these interned individuals were released into the workforce again in an attempt to boost the economy and the war effort.

Second World War

In contrast to the previous war, by virtue of the Statute of Westminster 1931, Canada instituted its measures separately from the United Kingdom. A state of apprehended war was declared on 25 August 1939, and the Defence of Canada Regulations were implemented under the Act. A state of war was declared with Germany on 10 September 1939.

The extreme security measures permitted by the Defence of Canada Regulations included the waiving of habeas corpus and the right to trial, internment, bans on political and religious groups, restrictions of free speech including the banning of certain publications, and the confiscation of property. S. 21 of the Defence of Canada Regulations allowed the Minister of Justice to detain without charge anyone who might act "in any manner prejudicial to the public safety or the safety of the state." The government soon interned fascists and Communists as well as opponents of conscription. The regulations were later used to intern Japanese Canadians on a large scale as well as some German and Italian Canadians who were viewed as enemy aliens.

In 1940, the more complex nature of organizing the war effort required the National Resources Mobilization Act to be adopted as well, and many subsequent regulations were brought into force by virtue of both of these Acts.

In 1943, the Supreme Court of Canada, in the Chemicals Reference, ruled that Orders in Council made under the Act were equivalent to an Act of Parliament, as Rinfret J observed:

(Citations omitted.) This authority was cited later in support of decisions taken in the Reference re Persons of Japanese Race.

The Act's effect was further clarified in the Wartime Leasehold Regulations Reference, which held that regulations instituting rental and housing controls displaced provincial jurisdiction for the duration of the emergency. As Taschereau J (as he then was) noted:

The Act was in force until 31 December 1945, after which the National Emergency Transitional Powers Act, 1945 was in force until 31 March 1947.  In 1947, the Continuation of Transitional Measures Act, 1947 was enacted, maintaining certain wartime orders and regulations, and stayed in place until 30 April 1951.

Treatment of Japanese Canadians

The attack on Pearl Harbor in 1941 led to Canada declaring war against Japan on 8 December 1941. An already established racial bias towards Japanese Canadians was transformed into full anti-Japanese thoughts and behaviour by Canadian citizens, who saw Japanese Canadians as spies for Japan. This fear towards Japanese Canadians led to the quick restriction of their rights and freedoms:

 On 17 December 1941, persons of Japanese descent were required to register with the Royal Canadian Mounted Police.
 On 29 January 1942, a protected area was declared by Government Notice within British Columbia.
 On 24 February, the Defence of Canada Regulations were amended to restrict Japanese Canadians from owning land or growing crops.
 On 26 February, a notice was issued instituting curfews on Japanese Canadians in the protected area of British Columbia, and restricting them from possessing motor vehicles, cameras, radios, firearms, ammunition or explosives.
 On 4 March, regulations under the Act were adopted to forcibly remove Japanese Canadians from the protected area. As a result, 12,000 were interned in interior camps, 2,000 were sent to road camps and another 2,000 were forced to work in the prairies at sugar beet farms.

In December 1945, three Orders in Council were issued to provide for the expulsion of Japanese nationals and other persons of Japanese origin, whether or not they were British subjects (either natural born or naturalized). Although the Supreme Court of Canada gave a mixed ruling on the matter, the Judicial Committee of the Privy Council declared all of them to be valid. Following various protests among politicians and academics, the orders were revoked in 1947.

Control of the wartime economy

At the beginning of the war, the Wartime Prices and Trade Board was created with a wide mandate to regulate all matters dealing with the necessities of life, rental and housing controls, import and export controls, and wage and price controls. In 1942, its responsibilities were expanded to include the reduction of non-essential industrial activities in order to maintain minimum requirements only for civilian goods.

The Act was also used to create the Wartime Labour Relations Regulations in order to control strikes and lockouts and keep wartime production going. While the regulations were initially restricted to industries under federal jurisdictions and companies directly involved in the war effort, provision was made for the provinces to co-opt into the scheme (which all eventually did).

As labour unrest was widespread at the time, a system of compulsory conciliation was brought into effect, and no strike or lockout could occur until:

 a collective agreement had expired,
 an attempt had been made to negotiate a new agreement,
 compulsory conciliation had been undertaken, and
 fourteen days after the conciliation period had elapsed.

There was, however, frustration on the part of the unions which felt that the government tended to not care about the issues the unions were trying to bring to light. The regulations continued after the war's end until 1948, where they were replaced by similar legislation at both the federal and provincial levels.

Postwar history

In 1960, the Act was amended by the Canadian Bill of Rights, in order to ensure that:

 actions taken under the Act were deemed not to be infringements of the latter statute, and
 proclamations to bring the Act into force were subject to abrogation by both the Senate and the House of Commons.

The October Crisis

In 1970, members of the Front de libération du Québec (FLQ) kidnapped British diplomat James Cross and Quebec provincial cabinet minister Pierre Laporte, who was later murdered. What is now referred to as the October Crisis raised fears in Canada of a militant faction rising up against the government.

Under provisions of the National Defence Act, the Canadian Armed Forces were deployed to assist the police.  They appeared on the streets of Ottawa on 12 October 1970. Upon request of the Quebec government with the unanimous consent of all party leaders in the Quebec National Assembly, troops appeared on the streets of Montreal on 15 October.

At the request of the Mayor of Montreal, Jean Drapeau, and the Quebec provincial government, and in response to general threats and demands made by the FLQ, the federal government declared a state of apprehended insurrection under the War Measures Act on 16 October. This was done so that police had more power in arrest and detention, in order to find and stop the FLQ members.

The use of the Act to address the problem presented by the FLQ was well supported by Canadians in all regions of Canada, according to a December Gallup Poll.  However, there were many vocal critics of the government action, including New Democratic Party leader Tommy Douglas, who said, "The government, I submit, is using a sledgehammer to crack a peanut."

While the Act was in force, 465 people were arrested and held without charge but were eventually released.

The response by the federal and provincial governments to the incident still sparks controversy. There was a large amount of concern about the act being used, as it was a considered to be a direct threat to civil liberties, removing rights such as habeas corpus from all Canadians. This is the only time that the Act had been put in place during peacetime in Canada.

Critics, such as Laurier LaPierre, accused Prime Minister Pierre Trudeau's move to suspend habeas corpus as more of a reaction to the separatist movement in Quebec by criminalizing it.

The Act's 1970 regulations were replaced by the Public Order (Temporary Measures) Act in November 1970, which subsequently expired on 30 April 1971.

In October 2020, Bloc Quebecois leader Yves-François Blanchet asked PM Justin Trudeau to apologize for the Canadian Government's invocation of the Act.

Replacement

In May 1981, the Emergency Planning Order was passed, which assigned responsibilities for planning to meet the exigencies of different types of emergencies to various Ministers, departments and agencies of government.

In 1988,  the Emergencies Act was  passed, and the War Measures Act was repealed as a consequence.

See also 
 Persecution of Jehovah's Witnesses in Canada

References

Further reading
Trudeau's Darkest Hour: War Measures in Time of Peace, Baraka Books, Montreal, 2010, 212 p.  .

External links

Text of Act
 "War Measures Act Debate Oct 16, 1970" from the Douglas-Coldwell Foundation
 Internment Camps in World War I and World War II in British Columbia
Ukrainian Canadian Civil Liberties Association
Canadian First World War Internment Recognition Fund

Canadian federal legislation
Emergency laws
1914 in Canadian law
October Crisis
Repealed Canadian legislation
World War I legislation